Sukumari Amma (6 October 1940 – 26 March 2013) was an Indian actress best known for her works in Malayalam and Tamil films. In a career spanning more than five decades, She has appeared in more than 2500 films predominantly in Malayalam, Tamil, Telugu, along with few  Hindi and one each in Sinhala, French, Bengali, Tulu, English and Kannada films. Sukumari began acting at the age of 10. In 2003, she was awarded the Padma Shri by the Government of India for her contributions toward the arts. She won the National Film Award for Best Supporting Actress for her role in the Tamil film Namma Gramam (2010). Sukumari died on 26 March 2013 in Chennai, following a heart attack.

Early life
Sukumari was born on 6 October 1940 in Nagercoil, Travancore (Currently in Tamil Nadu), to Malayali parents Madhavan Nair (a bank manager) and Sathyabhama Amma of Tharishuthala Valia Veedu in Kalkulam (in present-day Kanyakumari District). Sathyabhama Amma was the niece of Narayani Pillai Kunjamma, a famous beauty who spurned the king in favour of marrying the aristocratic landowner Kesava Pillai of Kandamath Through her cousin, Ambika Sukumaran, she is related to the Travancore Royal Family.

She studied at Poojappura LP School until second grade; she then moved to Madras, where she studied until fourth forum. She had four sisters (Rajakumari, Sreekumari, Jayasree and Girija) and one brother, Shankar. Lalitha, Padmini, Ragini (Travancore Sisters) were her cousins.

Career
Sukumari was noticed by a director when she visited the sets of a film with Padmini, and she made her film debut in the lead role in the Tamil film Or Iravu. She acted in various Malayalam and Tamil Films of the black and white era, such as Udhyogastha, by P. Venu, Chettathi, Kusruthikkuttan, Kunjali Marakkar, Thacholi Othenan, Yakshi and Karinizhal. She later became popular after starring in various films of Priyadarshan such as Poochakkoru Mookkuthi, Oodarathuammava Aalariyam, Boeing Boeing and Vandanam. She also appeared in various films directed by Balachandra Menon such as Manicheppu Thurannappol and Karyam Nissaram. In later years, she played a major role in Nizhalkuthu (2002), directed by Adoor Gopalakrishnan. She played many notable mother roles.

She mastered dance forms like Kathakali, Bharathanatyam, Kerala Natanam and many musical instruments. From the age of seven, she performed all over India and different parts of the world including USA, Singapore, Malaysia, Ceylon, Australia and so on. Sukumari is also known for her stage career in her early days, most prominently as a member of Cho Ramaswamy's theatre group; Viveka Fine Arts (more than 5000 stage shows). She was a member of Y. G. Parthasarathy's and Pattu's drama troupe; United Amateur Artists (more than 1000 stage shows), Rajasulochana's dance troupe; Pushpanjali (more than 5000 stage shows), Travancore Sisters' Dancers of India troupe (many stage shows), T. D. Kusalakumari's troupe;  (more than 1000 stage shows) and Padmini's independent dance drama troupe;Premanand Pictures (many stage shows) etc. for many decades. Awards in the name of Sukumari have been instituted for the memory like "Vanita Ratnam Award" : in the field of acting. "Mikacha Nadi Sukumari Puraskaram" by ACTA annakkara, "Sukumari Smaraka Foundation Award" by True Indian Information and Guidance Society and "Famea Sukumari Puraskaram".

Her memoirs in the film industry have been compiled in a book called "Ormakalude Vellithira" by M.S Dileep. "Sukumari Sradhanjali Parambara" is another book on her.

Personal life
Sukumari married director A. Bhimsingh in 1959. He died in 1978, when she was 38. The couple had a son, Suresh, who has acted in films such as Amme Narayana, Yuvajanotsavam and Cheppu, and is a professional doctor. Suresh married Uma, a costume designer. Suresh and Uma have a son named Vignesh.

Death
On 26 March 2013, Sukumari died from a cardiac arrest at a hospital in Chennai, where she was receiving treatments for burns she had sustained while lighting a traditional lamp at her residence in February 2013.

Following her death, several South Indian personalities offered their condolences. Tamil Nadu Chief Minister Jayalalithaa, who had co-starred with Sukumari, said in a condolence message that Sukumari had left a unique imprint on South Indian cinema and theatre with her talents. Kerala's Chief Minister, Oommen Chandy called Sukumari a "phenomenon in Malayalam cinema". Actor and Minister for Cinema K. B. Ganesh Kumar said actors in the Malayalam film industry had lost "the loving presence of a mother in the sets". Leader of the Opposition V. S. Achuthanandan called Sukumari's death a "huge loss for Indian cinema". Kerala Pradesh Congress Committee president Ramesh Chennithala said Sukumari would be remembered for "the diversity of characters that she gave life to". Communist Party of India State Secretary Pannian Ravindran said Sukumari was "an unforgettable acting genius". Union Minister of State for Food and Consumer Affairs K. V. Thomas described Sukumari as an actor who conquered the film scene with her unique acting style. South Indian Film Artistes Association president R. Sarathkumar remembered the actress as being an inspiration to others. Actor and renowned television producer Raadhika recalled Sukumari's many dance performances. Actor and president of Association of Malayalam Movie Artists Innocent said at a condolence meeting at Kochi that her death was an irreparable loss to Malayalam film industry. South Indian film star Mohanlal likened her death to the loss of "a mother, sister and a good friend". Speaker G. Karthikeyan also expressed grief at her death. Director Shaji Kailas deemed her loss an "irreparable one for the film industry".

Partial filmography

Awards and honours

Advertisements

Sukumari got appeared in various print features, audio-visual endorsements,online promotions, commercial public campaigns etc.

Amma Ammayiyamma
Aparna Natual Foods
Assal
Chalachithram Magazine
Chithrabhumi
Chungath Jewellery
Goodwin Jewellers
Grand Kerala Shopping Festival
Grihalakshmi Magazine
Happy Home Grihasri Kuris Pvt Ltd
Indumukhi Chandramathi (Season 1)
Jewellery ad co-starring Reenu Mathews
Joy Alukkas Jewellery
 Jingles
Kalakaumudi
 Kanikka Audio CD
 Kapil Ganesh Photography
 Keralakaumudi
 Kerala Food Festival
 Kerala Kitchen Restaurant
 Krishna Thulasi Hair Tonic
 Madhyamam Aazhchapathippu Magazine
 Malayala Cinemayile S.F. Fareed
 Malayala Manorama
 Mamma Mia Food Court
 Mammootty Times
 Manikinar Souvenir
 Manorama Weekly
 Mathrubhumi Calendar
 Mathrubhumi Varanthapathippu
 MK Fabrics
 Modern Cakes
 Mumbai Police film
 Nana Magazine
 Nana Film Weekly
 Nebula Soap
 New India Assurance
 Parakkat Jewels
 Parisudhan Coconut Oil
 Pesum Padam Magazine
 Ponny Silks
 Rajadhani Restaurant
 Rashtradeepika Cinema Magazine
 Remy Talcum Powder
 Road Safety
 Samson and Sons Builders
 Snehasallapam Magazine
 Spice Garden
 Sreyas Haridasan Photography
 Sukumari Sradhanjali Parambara
 Sukumari Ormakalude Vellithira
 Surya Music
 Tharavadu Restaurant
 Umamaheswara Locket
 Vanitha Magazine
 Vanitha Police film

See also
Cinema of India

References

External links

 
 
  - Sukumari's debut in Or Iravu featuring as young Lalitha

People from Kanyakumari district
1940 births
2013 deaths
Actresses from Thiruvananthapuram
20th-century Indian actresses
Indian film actresses
Kerala State Film Award winners
Recipients of the Padma Shri in arts
Actresses in Malayalam cinema
Filmfare Awards South winners
Best Supporting Actress National Film Award winners
Recipients of the Kalaimamani Award
21st-century Indian actresses
Actresses in Tamil cinema
Actresses in Telugu cinema
Actresses in Kannada cinema
Actresses in Hindi cinema
Tamil television actresses
Indian stage actresses
Child actresses in Tamil cinema
Actresses in Malayalam television
Actresses in Tamil television
Tamil comedians
Tamil Nadu State Film Awards winners
Indian female dancers
Dancers from Kerala
Women artists from Kerala
Actresses in Malayalam theatre
Indian voice actresses
Indian women television presenters
Indian television presenters
Telugu comedians
Female models from Kerala